Albay,  officially the Province of Albay, is a province in the Bicol Region of the Philippines, mostly on the southeastern part of the island of Luzon. Its capital (and largest city) is the city of Legazpi, the regional center of the whole Bicol Region, which is located in the southern foothill of Mayon Volcano.

The province was added to the UNESCO World Network of Biosphere Reserves in March 2016.

History

Pre-Hispanic period
Long before the Spaniards arrived, Albay had a thriving civilization. Formerly called Ibat, and then Libog, Albay was once ruled by Gat Ibal, an old chief who also founded the old barangay of Sawangan, now part of the City of Legazpi. Historian William Henry Scott wrote that in the local epic called siday entitled "Bingi of Lawan", an Albay Datu by the name of Dumaraog went to the Lakanate of Lawan to ask for the hands of Bingi bringing with him 100 ships. Lawan is a prosperous Lakanate in Samar. Datu Hadi Iberein came from the Lakanate of Lawan. He was described by Scott as a “Samar datu by the name of Iberein was rowed out to a Spanish vessel anchored in his harbor in 1543 by oarsmen collared in gold; while wearing on his own person earrings and chains.”

Spanish colonial period
In July 1569, Luis Enriquez de Guzman, a member of the expedition led by Maestro de Campo Mateo de Saz and Captain Martin de Goiti, led a group which crossed from Burias and Ticao islands and landed on a coastal settlement called Ibalon in what is now the province of Sorsogon. From this point another expedition was sent to explore the interior and founded the town of Camalig.

In 1573, Juan de Salcedo penetrated the Bicol Peninsula from the north as far south as Libon, establishing the settlement of Santiago de Libon. Jose Maria Peñaranda, a military engineer, was made “corregidor” of the province on May 14, 1834. He constructed public buildings and built roads and bridges.

The entire Bicol Peninsula was organized as one province with two divisions, Camarines in the northwest and Ibalon in the southeast. In 1636, the two partidos were separated, and Ibalon became a separate province with Sorsogon as capital. In the 17th century, Moro slave raiders from southern Philippines ravaged the northeastern coastal areas of the province of Albay.

Mayon Volcano, in one of its most violent eruptions, destroyed the five towns surrounding its base on February 1, 1814. This eruption forced the town of Cagsawa to relocate to its present site, Legazpi.

A decree was issued by Governor-General Narciso Claveria in 1846 separating Masbate, Ticao and Burias from Albay to form the comandancia of Masbate. Albay was then divided into four districts: Iraya, Cordillera or Tabaco, Sorsogon and Catanduanes.

Philippine revolution
Glicerio Delgado, a condemned  (insurgent), started revolutionary activities in the province. With a headquarters in the mountain of Guinobatan town, he joined the revolutionary government of Albay as a lieutenant in the infantry.

A unit of the Philippine Militia was then organized by the Spanish military authorities. Mariano Riosa was appointed major of the Tabaco Zone, which comprised all the towns along the seacoast from Albay to Tiwi while Anacieto Solano was appointed major for the Iraya Zone, which was made up of the towns from Daraga to Libon. Each town was organized into sections of fifty men under the command of a lieutenant.

During the Philippine Revolution on September 22, 1898, the provisional revolutionary government of Albay was formed with Anacieto Solano as provisional president. Major General Vito Belarmino, the appointed military commander, reorganized the Filipino Army in the province.

American colonial period
Following the Spanish–American War, the new colonial power the United States did not recognize the country's independence, which had been declared in June 1898, and the Americans subsequently acquired direct control of the country as a de facto colony, under the terms of the Treaty of Paris (1898), over which the Filipinos had no say. During the Philippine–American War, Brigadier General William August Kobbé headed the expedition that landed at the ports of Sorsogon, Bulan and Donsol. From there, the Americans marched to Legazpi and captured it.

Although a civil government was established in Albay on April 26, 1901, Colonel Harry Hill Bandholtz, Commanding Officer of the Constabulary in the Bicol Region, said that General Simeon Ola, with a thousand men, continued to defy American authority after the capture of Belarmino in 1901. Ola was later captured with about six hundred of his men.

World War II
Following the December 12, 1941, Japanese invasion of Legazpi during the Second World War, the Kimura Detachment of the Imperial Japanese Army occupied Albay Province. The region was defended only by the Philippine Constabulary unit under the command of Major Francisco Sandico.

During the Japanese Occupation, the military general headquarters of the Commonwealth Army of the Philippines remained active from January 3, 1942, to June 30, 1946, and the 5th Constabulary Regiment of the Philippine Constabulary was established from October 28, 1944, to June 30, 1946, and stationed in Albay. Then came the clearing operations and anti-Japanese insurgency in the Bicol Peninsula, helped by the local Bicolano resistance. Some Bicolano guerrilla groups invaded around the province of Albay during the Japanese Insurgencies between 1942 and 1944 and were supported by local Filipino troops under the Philippine Commonwealth Army and pre-war Philippine Constabulary 5th Infantry Regiments attacking the enemy soldiers of the Japanese Imperial Army. In the aftermath of three years of siege and conflicts, many Bicolano guerrillas were forced to retreat by the Japanese around the province before liberation in 1945 by Allied forces.

Geography

The province is bordered by the provinces of Camarines Sur to the north and Sorsogon to the south. To the northeast lies Lagonoy Gulf, which separates the province from Catanduanes.

The Albay Biosphere Reserve is home to 182 terrestrial plant species, of which 46 are endemic to the Philippines. Its marine waters and coastal area also provide habitat to five of the world's seven marine turtle species, as well as mangrove, seagrass and seaweed ecosystems.

Topography
The province is generally mountainous with scattered fertile plains and valleys. On the eastern part of the province is a line of volcanic mountains starting with the northernmost Malinao in Tiwi, followed by Mount Masaraga and the free-standing Mayon Volcano. Separated by the Poliqui Bay is the Pocdol Mountains in the town of Manito.

It is the most famous landform in Albay and in the whole Bicol Region. This active volcano falls under the jurisdiction of eight municipalities and cities of Albay: Camalig, Daraga, Guinobatan, Legazpi City, Ligao City, Malilipot, Santo Domingo, and Tabaco City.

Among these mountains are Mount Catburawan in Ligao and Mount Pantao in Oas.

Administrative divisions
Albay comprises 15 municipalities/towns and three component cities (Legazpi, Ligao and Tabaco).

Demographics

The population of Albay in the 2020 census was 1,374,768 people,, making it the 20th most populous province in the country. Based on the 2007 census, there were 208,640 households in the province with an average size of 5.22 persons, significantly higher than the national average of 4.99.

Religion

Catholicism is the predominant religion in the province, affiliated by 96.1% of the men and 95.7% of the women of Albay. Each town has its own fiesta for their patrons and patronesses. Other religious denominations are the Iglesia ni Cristo (INC), other Protestant churches such as the Baptist Church, Methodist, other Evangelical Christians, Seventh-day Adventists, Mormons, Jehovah's Witnesses as well as Islam.

Prior to colonization, the region had a complex religious system which involved various deities. Among these deities include: Gugurang, the supreme god who dwells inside of Mount Mayon where he guards and protects the sacred fire in which Aswang, his brother was trying to steal. Whenever people disobey his orders, wishes and commit numerous sins, he would cause Mount Mayon to burst lava as a sign of warning for people to mend their crooked ways. Ancient Bikolanos had a rite performed for him called Atang. Asuang, the evil god who always tries to steal the sacred fire of Mount Mayon from his brother, Gugurang. Addressed sometimes as Aswang, he dwells mainly inside Mount Malinao. As an evil god, he would cause the people to suffer misfortunes and commit sins. Enemy of Gugurang and a friend of Bulan the god of the moon; Haliya, the masked goddess of the moonlight and the archenemy of Bakunawa and protector of Bulan. Her cult is composed primarily of women. There is also a ritual dance named after her as it is performed to be a countermeasure against Bakunawa.; Bulan, the god of the pale moon, he is depicted as a pubescent boy with uncommon comeliness that made savage beast and the vicious mermaids (Magindara) tame. He has deep affection towards Magindang, but plays with him by running away so that Magindang would never catch him. The reason for this is because he is shy to the man that he loves. If Magindang manages to catch Bulan, Haliya always comes to free him from Magindang's grip; Magindang, the god of the sea and all its creatures. He has deep affection to the lunar god Bulan and pursues him despite never catching him. Due to this, the Bicolanos reasoned that it is to why the waves rise to reach the moon when seen from the distant horizon. Whenever he does catch up to Bulan, Haliya comes to rescue Bulan and free him immediately; Okot, god of forest and hunting; and Bakunawa,  a gigantic sea serpent deity who is often considered as the cause of eclipses, the devourer of the sun and the moon, and an adversary of Haliya as Bakunawa's main aim is to swallow Bulan, who Haliya swore to protect for all of eternity.

Languages
Albay is home to several languages and host to different native languages of Bicol Region. Out of seven Bikol languages (excluding the Bisakol languages, which are Bisayan languages), only Pandan Bikol of northern Catanduanes is not used or which the origin is not from Albay. The languages in the province are very diverse which includes the languages of Albay Bikol group which comprises the languages of West Miraya, East Miraya, Libon and Buhinon. Of the four Albay Bikol languages, Buhinon is the only one not used in Albay but rather in Buhi, Camarines Sur.

Rinconada Bikol is a minority language in the province and used by people in barangays of Libon and Polangui that are near the boundary of Bato and Iriga in Camarines Sur. Another primary language used in the province is Central Bikol which is the native tongue of the population on the eastern coast of the Bicol Peninsula. Both Albay Bikol languages and Rinconada Bikol are members of Inland Bikol group of languages while Central Bikol is a language member of Coastal Bikol. The Tabaco - Legazpi - Sorsogon dialect of Central Bikol is spoken in Legazpi, Tabaco and neighboring municipalities on the east side of Albay, and some parts of northern Sorsogon (especially in Sorsogon City).

The majority of the inhabitants also understand English and Filipino as second languages.

Economy

Agriculture is the main industry in Albay, which produces crops like coconut, rice, sugar and abacá. Handicrafts are the major source of rural income and comprises a fairly large share in the small-scale industries of the province. Forestry, cement production and paper-making are other sources of livelihood. The manufacture of abacá products such as Manila hemp, hats, bags, mats, furniture, home decors, and slippers is one of the main sources of income in the rural areas. Production of abaca fiber experienced a boom from the late 1800s until the American period. Fishing is the main livelihood along both shores of the province. Tourism, especially related to Mayon Volcano, also creates income for Albay. For the year 2013, Albay had a total of 339,445 foreign tourist arrivals.

Government
Albay has three congressional districts encompassing its 18 municipalities and 3 component cities.

Transportation

Roads
Albay has  of national roads, mostly paved with asphalt, with  remaining unpaved. Maharlika Highway (N1/AH26) serves as the principal road connection between other provinces. Most of the province is served by secondary national roads, assigned route numbers in the series, namely Bicol-630 and Bicol-640. Almost all of the cities and municipalities are connected by national roads, except for Rapu-Rapu.

In order to spur development in the province, The Toll Regulatory Board declared Toll Road 5 the extension of South Luzon Expressway. A 420-kilometer, four lane expressway starting from the terminal point of the now under construction SLEX Toll Road 4 at Barangay Mayao, Lucena City in Quezon to Matnog, Sorsogon, near the Matnog Ferry Terminal. On August 25, 2020, San Miguel Corporation announced that they will invest the project which will reduce travel time from Lucena to Matnog from 9 hours to 5.5 hours.

Water transport

Albay is the region's principal trans-shipment point with its ports: Tabaco International Port, Legazpi National Port, Pio Duran Provincial Port, and the Pantao Regional Port.

Air transport
Traveling to the province by air is served by the Bicol International Airport in the municipality of Daraga, adjacent municipality of Legazpi City. The airport is the province's gateway from Manila and Cebu City in the Visayas. The province was formerly served by the now defunct Legazpi Airport.

Railroads
Albay is served by the mainline of the Philippine National Railways (PNR), and has commuter service between Naga in Camarines Sur. Trains to Manila (Tutuban), the Mayon Limited, is suspended from November 2012. Four stations serve Polangui, Ligao, Guinobatan, and Legazpi, respectively.

See also
 Biosphere reserves of the Philippines

References

External links

 
 
 
 New Albay Tourism Promotion Website
 Province of Albay Official Website 

 
Provinces of the Philippines
Provinces of the Bicol Region
States and territories established in 1636
1636 establishments in the Philippines
Biosphere reserves of the Philippines